The following is a timeline of the presidency of Joe Biden during the fourth quarter of 2022, from October 1 to December 31, 2022. To navigate between quarters, see timeline of the Joe Biden presidency.

Timeline

October 2022

November 2022

December 2022

See also
 Presidential transition of Joe Biden
 List of executive actions by Joe Biden
 List of presidential trips made by Joe Biden (international trips)
 Timeline of the 2020 United States presidential election

Notes

References

2022 Q4
Presidency of Joe Biden
October 2022 events in the United States
November 2022 events in the United States
December 2022 events in the United States
Political timelines of the 2020s by year
2022 timelines